Simon Codrington may refer to:

Simon Codrington (American football) of the 2006 Florida Gators football team
Sir Simon Francis Bethell Codrington, 3rd Baronet (1923–2005) of the Codrington baronets

See also
Codrington (surname)